Rice Garland (September 30, 1799August 13, 1863) was an American lawyer, jurist, and politician who served as a United States representative from Louisiana from 1834 to 1840.

Biography 
Garland was born in Lynchburg, Virginia, and he pursued a basic education, studied law and was admitted to the bar and commenced the practice of law.  He moved to Opelousas, Louisiana, in 1820 and continued the practice of his profession.

Congress 
Garland was elected from the Louisiana's 3rd congressional district as an Anti-Jacksonian in 1833 to the Twenty-third Congress to fill the vacancy caused by the resignation of Henry Adams Bullard.  He was reelected as an Anti-Jacksonian to the Twenty-fourth Congress and as a Whig to the Twenty-fifth and Twenty-sixth Congresses, in which he served as chairman of the Committee on Expenditures in the Department of War.  Garland served in Congress from April 28, 1834, to July 21, 1840, when he resigned to accept an appointment as judge of the Supreme Court of Louisiana.

Later career and death 
He served in that capacity, with residence in New Orleans, until 1846. In 1846, he moved to Brownsville, Texas, and continued the practice of law until his death in that city in 1863; 

He was buried in a cemetery at Brownsville.

References

1799 births
1863 deaths
Justices of the Louisiana Supreme Court
Louisiana National Republicans
National Republican Party members of the United States House of Representatives
Whig Party members of the United States House of Representatives from Louisiana
19th-century American politicians
19th-century American judges